Goascorán is a municipality in the Honduran department of Valle.

Demographics
At the time of the 2013 Honduras census, Goascorán municipality had a population of 14,342. Of these, 96.07% were Mestizo, 3.05% White, 0.77% Black or Afro-Honduran, 0.08% Indigenous and 0.03% others.

References

External links

Municipalities of the Valle Department